Zhao Honglüe is a professional Chinese footballer who currently plays for Henan Songshan Longmen as a right-footed left-back or right winger in the Chinese Super League.

Club career
Zhao Honglüe would start his football career playing for the various Dalian Shide F.C. youth teams before he was loaned out to the team's youth team called Dalian Shide Siwu FC that was allowed to take part in Singapore's 2008 S.League. Upon his return to Dalian Shide at the beginning of the 2009 Chinese Super League Zhao would make his debut for the team in the club's first game of the season as a late substitute on March 22, 2009 in a 4-1 defeat to Tianjin Teda. After the game Zhao would go on to become a vital member of the team as the club gained mid-table positions for the next several seasons, eventually going on to score his first league goal for them on April 28, 2012 in a 1-1 draw against Hangzhou Greentown.

On 26 February 2015, Zhao transferred to fellow Chinese Super League side Tianjin Teda. The Head coach Jaime Pacheco would convert Zhao from a midfielder to a left back before Zhao made his debut for the club on 8 March 2015 in a league game against Henan Jianye F.C. in a 3-1 defeat.

Career statistics 
Statistics accurate as of match played 31 December 2020.

References

External links
Player profile at Sodasoccer.com
 

1989 births
Living people
Association football fullbacks
Chinese footballers
Footballers from Dalian
Dalian Shide F.C. players
Dalian Professional F.C. players
Tianjin Jinmen Tiger F.C. players
Chinese Super League players
Footballers at the 2010 Asian Games
Asian Games competitors for China